Andreas Mattfeldt (born 28 September 1969) is a German politician of the Christian Democratic Union (CDU) who has been serving as a member of the Bundestag from the state of Lower Saxony since 2009.

Political career 
Mattfeldt became a member of the Bundestag in the 2009 German federal election, representing the Osterholz – Verden district. He is a member of the Committee on Petitions, the Budget Committee and its Subcommittee on European Affairs. On the Budget Committee, he serves as his parliamentary group’s rapporteur on the annual budget of the Federal Ministry for Economic Affairs and Energy.

Political positions 
In June 2017, Mattfeldt voted against his parliamentary group’s majority and in favor of Germany's introduction of same-sex marriage.

References

External links 

  
 Bundestag biography 

1969 births
Living people
Members of the Bundestag for Lower Saxony
Members of the Bundestag 2021–2025
Members of the Bundestag 2017–2021
Members of the Bundestag 2013–2017
Members of the Bundestag 2009–2013
Members of the Bundestag for the Christian Democratic Union of Germany